William Doxford & Sons Ltd, often referred to simply as Doxford, was a British shipbuilding and marine engineering company.

History

William Doxford founded the company in 1840. From 1870 it was based in Pallion, Sunderland, on the River Wear in Northeast England. The Company was managed by William Doxford's four sons following his death in 1882. It was acquired by Northumberland Shipbuilding Company in 1918.

It was renamed Doxford & Sunderland Shipbuilding & Engineering Co Ltd in 1961 and Doxford & Sunderland Ltd in 1966. Court Line took it over in 1972 and renamed it Sunderland Shipbuilders Ltd.

In the 1970s a new all-weather Pallion yard was built which could build two ships of up to 30,000 tons deadweight side-by-side. The steel came in at one end, and the completed ship left from the other with engines installed and sometimes with the machinery running.

Court Line collapsed in 1974 and the company was nationalised. It was privatised in 1986 when it was merged with Austin & Pickersgill to form North East Shipbuilders. However, the last ship built at Pallion was floated out of the yard in 1989 after which it closed as a shipbuilding yard. The old shipyard is now occupied by Pallion Engineering Limited, whilst  the former marine engine works is occupied by W.H.Forster (Printers) Ltd.

Operations

Doxford was a major British shipbuilder. It also made marine diesel engines, the last of which it built in 1980.

See also
 List of shipbuilders and shipyards
 Turret deck ship
 
 
 Badagry Palm (1979) – the last Doxford marine engine (J-Type)

References

External links

 Doxford Engine Friends Association
 William Doxford and Sons page on Ships Nostalgia website. Membership (free) is required.
 

Defunct shipbuilding companies of the United Kingdom
Former defence companies of the United Kingdom
Marine engine manufacturers
Engine manufacturers of the United Kingdom
Shipbuilding companies of the City of Sunderland
Manufacturing companies established in 1840
Manufacturing companies disestablished in 1986
British Shipbuilders